Innerdalstårnet or Dalatårnet is a  tall mountain on the south side of the Innerdalen valley in Sunndal Municipality in Møre og Romsdal county, Norway. The mountain is also known as the Matterhorn of Norway for its characteristic pyramidal shape.

The summit can be reached with some scrambling, and the mountain is a very popular destination for rock climbing, several routes are established up the mountain.

The northern sub-peak, Litle Innerdalstårnet (seen in the picture) is slightly more inaccessible.  Directly south of Innerdalstårnet are the mountains Tårnfjellet and Såtbakkollen, which is the second highest in Trollheimen.  The mountain Skarfjellet lies just to the west on the other side of the lake Storvatnet.

References

Mountains of Møre og Romsdal
Sunndal